Father Hubert Friedrich Heinrich Schiffer, S.J. (July 15, 1915 in Gütersloh, Province of Westphalia, Prussia, German Empire – March 27, 1982 in Frankfurt, West Germany) was a German Jesuit who survived the atomic bomb "Little Boy" dropped on Hiroshima.

Hiroshima bombing
Schiffer started the Myth of the Miracle of Hiroshima by the Apparition of Mary in Fatima.
Jesuits and their location
Many retellings of the event state there were eight Jesuit priests (or missionaries), who were eight blocks from ground zero. John Hersey, in his contemporary 1946 account Hiroshima, lists four Jesuit priests (Father Superior LaSalle [sic], Father Wilhelm Kleinsorge, Father Cieslik, and Father Schiffer) and places them  "from the center." Schiffer himself states there were four Jesuit priests — "Father Hugo Lassalle, Superior of the whole Jesuit Mission in Japan, and Fathers Kleinsorge, Cieslik, and Schiffer" — and describes his own location as "within the most deadly one-mile radius." Schiffer also notes the name of their church — "the Jesuit Church of Our Lady's Assumption."

Explosion
According to the 1946 account of Jesuit priest Father John Siemes, who had been on the outskirts of the city:

Schiffer's own account describes the explosion:

Survivors
All four Jesuit priests survived the explosion. Quoted in 1950, Schiffer said, "Of 14 clergy and laymen we lost only one, a Japanese." The Jesuits were in a building stronger than most surrounding buildings, as noted by Hersey and Siemes, respectively:

They were not the only survivors close to ground zero; an estimated 14% of people within  of ground zero survived the explosion. One person survived at a distance of just , protected in the basement of a building while looking for documents.

Religious aspects
The survival of the priests has sometimes been referred to as a miracle. In 1951, Schiffer said:

Similarities with Nagasaki are sometimes highlighted, where a Franciscan friary established by St. Maximilian Kolbe was "unaffected by the bomb which fell there", as "the friary was protected from the force of the bomb by an intervening mountain".

Later life
Schiffer met both the pilot and co-pilot of the B-29 that bombed Hiroshima, the Enola Gay. In New York City in 1951, Schiffer met co-pilot Robert A. Lewis. Schiffer invited Lewis to visit Hiroshima in August 1952 for the dedication of a "palace of prayer", which Lewis accepted; however, there is no record of Lewis actually making such a visit. The two also appeared together at Fordham University in 1957, on the twelfth anniversary of the bombing, with Schiffer noting that they had become "very fast friends." Schiffer later met pilot Paul Tibbets in Dallas in 1975.

Schiffer, who had received a bachelor's degree in Japan, received a master's degree from Fordham University in 1952, and a doctorate there in 1958. In the 1960s, Schiffer worked as an associate professor of economics at St. Joseph's College in Philadelphia, and wrote a book on the Japanese banking system.

See also

 Julia Canny
 Hibakusha

Works

References

Further reading

External links
 

1915 births
1982 deaths
20th-century German Jesuits
Hibakusha
German Roman Catholic missionaries
Roman Catholic missionaries in Japan